Broadrick is a surname. Notable people with the surname include:

 Annette Broadrick (born 1938), American novel writer
 Justin Broadrick (born 1969), English musician, singer and songwriter
 Justin Broadrick discography

Other uses
 Broadrick v. Oklahoma, US Supreme Court decision
 Broadrick Secondary School, Singapore

See also
 Brodrick
 Broderick (disambiguation)